Lieutenant General Sir George Byng Harman  (30 January 1830 – 9 March 1892) was a senior British Army officer who went on to be Military Secretary.

Military career
Educated at Marlborough College, Harman was commissioned into the 34th Regiment of Foot in 1849. He served in the Crimean War and took part in the assault on the Redan during the Siege of Sevastopol in 1855 and was severely wounded. He also served with his Regiment in putting down the Indian Mutiny and was present at the Capture of Lucknow in 1857. He became Assistant Inspector of Volunteers in 1860 and Assistant Military Secretary in the West Indies in 1866. In 1873 he took command of a Brigade Depot at Pontefract, in 1874 he became Assistant Adjutant-General at Aldershot and in 1878 he was appointed Deputy Adjutant-General in Ireland.

In 1882 he joined the General Staff for the Expedition to Egypt taking command of the Garrison at Alexandria.

He became Deputy Adjutant-General at Army Headquarters in 1883 and Military Secretary in 1885. In that capacity he gave evidence to the Camperdown Committee, which were reviewing medical services in the British Army, and in his evidence accused Medical Officers of "affecting to be combatant officers" in order to secure promotion.

He was still serving on the staff at headquarters when he died in South Kensington on 9 March 1892.

Family
He married in 1868 Helen, daughter of John Tonge of Starborough Castle and Edenbridge, Kent; she survived him.

Notes

References

 

1830 births
1892 deaths
Military personnel from London
People educated at Marlborough College
British military personnel of the Indian Rebellion of 1857
Knights Commander of the Order of the Bath
British Army lieutenant generals
British Army personnel of the Crimean War
British Army personnel of the Anglo-Egyptian War
34th Regiment of Foot officers